

Members

References 

118
Miami-Dade County, Florida